Alipasha Dzhalalovich Umalatov (1 May 1927 – 21 June 2022) was a Russian politician.

A member of the Communist Party of the Soviet Union, he served as Chairman of the Council of Ministers of the Dagestan ASSR from 1967 to 1978 and Chairman of the Presidium of the Supreme Soviet of the Dagestan ASSR from 1978 to 1987.

Umalatov died in Makhachkala on 21 June 2022 at the age of 95.

References

1927 births
2022 deaths
Russian politicians
Soviet politicians
Eighth convocation members of the Supreme Soviet of the Soviet Union
Ninth convocation members of the Supreme Soviet of the Soviet Union
Members of the Supreme Soviet of the Russian Soviet Federative Socialist Republic, 1980–1985
Members of the Supreme Soviet of the Russian Soviet Federative Socialist Republic, 1985–1990
Recipients of the Order of Honour (Russia)
Recipients of the Order of the Red Banner of Labour
People from Karabudakhkentsky District